The Certificate of Galician Studies (CELGA) (in Galician: Certificado de Estudos de Lingua Galega) is a standardised proficiency test for the Galician language.  The various levels of the CELGA (1–5) align with CEFR levels (A2-C2). 3,863 people took the CELGA exam in 2012.  It is organised by la Secretaría General de Política Lingüística, a part of the Galician government. The CELGA exam was founded in 2007 in accordance with the criteria of the Association of Language Testers in Europe, a group that tests language ability.

Levels
CELGA 1: A2 – Able to express yourself very basically.
CELGA 2: B1 – Can relatively effectively communicate in a variety of situations.
CELGA 3: B2 – Able to talk effectively about a wide variety of subjects.
CELGA 4: C1 – Can speak fluently and spontaneously in the majority of cases
CELGA 5: C2 – Can speak without difficulty and can communicate without any problem in formal and informal situations

References

Galician language
Language tests